SOKO – Der Prozess is a German five-part crossover between five ZDF SOKO series, combining the special investigative teams from Munich, Cologne, Leipzig, Stuttgart, and Wismar. It was broadcast from 30 September 2013 to 4 October 2013, on German television channel ZDF.

Cast and characters

SOKO teams

Guest cast

Episodes

See also
 List of German television series

References

External links
 
 SOKO – Der Prozess at ZDF
 SOKO – Der Prozess at Fernsehserien.de

German drama television series
German crime television series
2010s German police procedural television series
2013 German television series debuts
2013 German television series endings
2000s German television series
German-language television shows
ZDF original programming